The 1952 Bulgarian Cup was the 12th season of the Bulgarian Cup (in this period the tournament was named Cup of the Soviet Army). Slavia Sofia won the competition, beating Spartak Sofia 3–1 in the final at the People's Army Stadium in Sofia.

First round

|-
!colspan="3" style="background-color:#D0F0C0; text-align:left;" |Replay

|-
!colspan="3" style="background-color:#D0F0C0; text-align:left;" |Second replay

|}

Quarter-finals

|-
!colspan="3" style="background-color:#D0F0C0; text-align:left;" |Replay

|}

Semi-finals

|-
!colspan="3" style="background-color:#D0F0C0; text-align:left;" |Replay

|-
!colspan="3" style="background-color:#D0F0C0; text-align:left;" |Second replay

|}

Final

Details

References

1952
1951–52 domestic association football cups
Cup